The Departmental Council of Yonne is the deliberative assembly of the French department of Yonne in the region of Bourgogne-Franche-Comté. It includes 42 departemental councillors from the 21 cantons of Yonne, elected for a term of six years. It is chaired by Patrick Gendraud (LR).

The head office of the departmental council is located in Auxerre.

Budget 
In 2021, the Council has a budget of 455.66 million euros:

Vice Presidents 
The President of the Departmental Council is assisted by 12 vice-presidents chosen from among the departmental advisers. Each of them has a delegation of authority.

References 

Yonne
Yonne